Erzsébet Horváth (born 1953) is a Hungarian sprint canoer who competed in the early 1970s. She won a silver medal in the K-4 500 m event at the 1973 ICF Canoe Sprint World Championships Tampere.

References

Hungarian female canoeists
Living people
ICF Canoe Sprint World Championships medalists in kayak
1953 births
20th-century Hungarian women